The Western Political Science Association (WPSA) is a professional association of political science scholars and students in the United States that was founded in 1947.

Aims 
The purpose of the WPSA is to promote the study and teaching of government and politics, to foster political research, and to facilitate a greater dialogue involving public affairs and policy making. The official region of the WPSA includes the western states of Alaska, Arizona, California, Colorado, Hawaii, Idaho, Montana, Nevada, New Mexico, Oregon, Texas, Utah, and Washington. In addition, it includes the Canadian provinces of Alberta, British Columbia, and Saskatchewan. However, one-third of the association's members are from other states and nations.

History 
The WPSA was founded in November, 1947, and held its first meeting at the University of Utah. At this time a constitution was adopted and officers were elected for the new organization. The first president of the association was G. Homer Durham (University of Utah). The WPSA was the second regional political science association formally recognized by the American Political Science Association. In 1995, the WPSA became incorporated in California as a nonprofit public benefit corporation. In 1998, the WPSA Executive Council appointed Elizabeth Moulds from California State University Sacramento to serve as the association's first executive director. Including her term as executive director, Moulds served as the chief administrative officer for the association for 25 years, before stepping down in 2009.

Annual meeting 
The WPSA Annual Meeting is a gathering of political scientists that rotates throughout the region. It occurs over a weekend in March or April each spring. Approximately 1,100 to 1,300 political scientists participate in this conference annually. The conference provides a forum for scholars to share research, discuss political science education, and network with other experts in their field.

Officers 
Former officers of the association include:
 President: Jane Junn  (University of Southern California)
 Vice-President/Program Chair: Jamie Meyerfeld (University of Washington)
 Recording Secretary: Jason Casellas (University of Houston)
 Treasurer: Michael W. Bowers (University of Nevada)
 Executive Director: Richard Clucas (Portland State University)
 Associate Director: Elsa J. Favila

Awards 
To recognize excellence in the profession, the association offers annual awards that are presented at the regional conference:
 Dissertation Award: Presented to an individual paper with the best doctoral dissertation completed at a university.
 Pi Sigma Alpha Award: Presented to the best paper presented at the previous WPSA annual meeting.
 The Betty Nesvold Women and Politics Award: Presented for the best paper on women and politics presented at the previous annual meeting.
 WPSA Best Paper Award on Latina/Latino Politics: Awarded for an outstanding paper on Latina/Latino politics and its relative aspects.
 Award by Committee on the Status of Blacks: Awarded for an outstanding paper discussing issues and problems which concern most Black Americans.
 Charles Redd Award for Best Paper on the Politics of the American West: an award offered jointly by the WPSA and the Charles Redd Center for Western Studies of Brigham Young University for the best paper on the politics of the American West.
 The Political Research Quarterly Best Article Award: This award is given for the best article published by the PRQ during the prior calendar year.
 WPSA Best Paper in Environmental Political Theory Award: Awarded to the best paper in environmental political theory presented at the annual WPSA meeting.

Publications 
The association publishes two academic journals.
 The Western Political Quarterly has served as the official journal of the organization since it was first published by the University of Utah in March, 1948. The relationship between the association and the journal was formalized in 1971. The journal was renamed Political Research Quarterly in 1992.
 Politics, Groups, and Identities, a new journal that was launched in 2013 covering questions and issues of identity politics.

References

External links 

Professional associations based in the United States
Political science organizations
Political science in the United States
1947 establishments in the United States
Organizations established in 1947